160th meridian may refer to:

160th meridian east, a line of longitude east of the Greenwich Meridian
160th meridian west, a line of longitude west of the Greenwich Meridian